Lorenzo Dalla Porta (born 22 June 1997) is an Italian motorcycle racer. He currently competes in the Moto2. He was the FIM CEV Moto3 Junior World Champion in 2016 and the CIV 125 GP champion in 2012 . And in 2019 he won the Moto3 World Championship.

Career

Moto3 World Championship

Husqvarna Factory Laglisse (2015)
In 2015 Dalla Porta started his Grand Prix career in Moto3 as a replacement rider for Isaac Viñales in Husqvarna Factory Laglisse. In 2015 Dalla Porta scored points twice in nine races and finished the championship standing at 25th place with 13 points.

Estrella Galicia 0,0 (2016)

Sky Racing Team VR46 (2016)
As Husqvarna left the Moto3 championship and all teams had their riders, Dalla Porta served as a replacement rider.

Aspar Team (2017)
He joined Aspar's team but underperformed on the Mahindra bikes scoring points in only three races all season.

Leopard Racing (2018–2019)
He joined Leopard Racing. In 2018 he got his first win in San Marino.

Lorenzo Dalla Porta became the 2019 Moto3 World Champion following his win in Australian GP held at Phillip Island.

Moto2 World Championship

Italtrans Racing Team (2020–2022)

Lorenzo Dalla Porta has joined the Italtrans Moto2 team for the 2020 season.

Pertamina Mandalika SAG Team (from 2023)
From 2023, he will race for Pertamina Mandalika SAG Team.

Career statistics

FIM CEV Moto3 Junior World Championship

Races by year
(key) (Races in bold indicate pole position, races in italics indicate fastest lap)

Grand Prix motorcycle racing

By season

By class

Races by year
(key) (Races in bold indicate pole position; races in italics indicate fastest lap)

References

External links

1997 births
Living people
Italian motorcycle racers
Moto3 World Championship riders
People from Prato
Moto2 World Championship riders
Sportspeople from the Province of Prato
Moto3 World Riders' Champions